Rhedaer Bach is a river of North Rhine-Westphalia, Germany. It flows into the Ems near Harsewinkel.

See also

List of rivers of North Rhine-Westphalia

References

Rivers of North Rhine-Westphalia
Rivers of Germany